Luigi Casola (11 July 1921 – 6 April 2009) was an Italian racing cyclist. He won stages 4 and 6 of the 1948 Giro d'Italia.

References

External links
 

1921 births
2009 deaths
Italian male cyclists
Italian Giro d'Italia stage winners
Cyclists from the Province of Varese